Admiral John Evans (1717 – 8 July 1794) was a Royal Navy officer.

Naval career
Evans joined the Royal Navy in 1731. Promoted to captain on 20 April 1748, he was given command of the post ship HMS Flamborough on promotion, the sixth-rate HMS Squirrel later in the year and the sixth-rate HMS Glasgow later still in the year. He went on to take command of the sixth-rate HMS Experiment in December 1753, the fifth-rate HMS Prince Edward in July 1755 and the fourth-rate HMS Preston in January 1757 as well as the third-rate HMS Augusta in 1767. He was promoted to commodore in 1778. Promoted to rear-admiral on 29 March 1779 and to vice-admiral on 26 September 1780, he became acting commander-in-chief the Downs in 1780 before being promoted to full admiral on 1 February 1793.

References

Royal Navy admirals
1717 births
1794 deaths